The 2023 Florida Atlantic Owls baseball team represents Florida Atlantic University in the sport of baseball for the 2023 college baseball season. The Owls compete in Division I of the National Collegiate Athletic Association (NCAA) and in Conference USA. They play their home games at FAU Baseball Stadium, on the university's Boca Raton campus. The team is coached by John McCormack, who is in his fifteenth season at Florida Atlantic.

On October 21, 2021, Florida Atlantic accepted the invitation to join the American Athletic Conference (AAC) and will become a full member on July 1, 2023. The 2023 season is the program's last as a member of C-USA.

Previous season

The 2022 Owls finished 35-23 overall, and 19-11 in the conference. They lost to Southern Miss during the 2022 Conference USA baseball tournament.

Preseason

C-USA media poll
The Conference USA preseason poll was released on February 2, 2023, with the Owls predicted to finish in third place.

Preseason All-CUSA teams
Nolan Schanuel - Outfielder
Hunter Cooley – Starting Pitcher

Personnel

Schedule and results

Schedule Source:

References

External links
•	FAU Baseball

Florida Atlantic
Florida Atlantic Owls baseball seasons
Florida Atlantic Owls baseball